Gharib Amzine (born May 3, 1973 in Montbéliard, Doubs) is a Moroccan professional football manager and former player who played as a  midfielder. He played for Mulhouse, Racing Strasbourg and Troyes AC.

Amzine made over 200 competitive appearances for Troyes, making him the club's most capped player as of March 2008.

Whilst at Strasbourg, Amzine played in the 2001 Coupe de France Final in which they beat Amiens SC on penalties.

Born in France, Amzine played for the Morocco national football team and was a participant at the 1998 FIFA World Cup.

He is managing Mulhouse since 2013.

International career

International goals
Scores and results list Morocco's goal tally first.

References

 

1973 births
Living people
Sportspeople  from Montbéliard
French footballers
Moroccan footballers
French sportspeople of Moroccan descent
Footballers from Bourgogne-Franche-Comté
Morocco international footballers
FC Mulhouse players
RC Strasbourg Alsace players
ES Troyes AC players
Ligue 1 players
Ligue 2 players
1998 FIFA World Cup players
2002 African Cup of Nations players
Moroccan football managers
FC Mulhouse managers
Association football midfielders